The Corps of Military Accountants was a short-lived corps of the British Army. It was formed in November 1919 and disbanded in July 1925. Its members handled financial matters, although matters relating to pay continued to be handled by the Royal Army Pay Corps.

All personnel serving as Military Accountant Officers and Military Accountant Clerks transferred to the new corps. On the disbandment of the corps most of its personnel who chose to stay in the Army either reverted to their previous regiments and corps or transferred to the RAPC.

Appointments
Officers, who held a minimum rank of Captain and were mostly qualified accountants, held appointments depending on rank, although they continued to use their normal ranks in day-to-day military life.

Colonel = Accountant Officer 1st Class
Lieutenant-Colonel = Accountant Officer 2nd Class
Major = Accountant Officer 3rd Class
Captain = Accountant Officer 4th, 5th or 6th Class

Warrant Officers and Other Ranks held appointments as follows:

Warrant Officer Class I = Accountant Sergeant Major
Warrant Officer Class II = Accountant Quartermaster Sergeant
Staff Sergeant = Accountant Staff Sergeant
Sergeant = Accountant Sergeant
Corporal = Writer Corporal
Lance-Corporal = Writer Lance-Corporal
Private = Writer Private

Footnotes

British administrative corps
Accounting in the United Kingdom
Military units and formations established in 1919
Military units and formations disestablished in 1925